Vincent DePaul Breen (December 24, 1936 – March 30, 2003) was an American prelate of the Roman Catholic Church who served as the third bishop of the Diocese of Metuchen in central New Jersey from 1997 until his resignation in 2002.

Breen was born in 1936 in Brooklyn, New York, to Edward and Irene (née Conway) Breen and attended St. Francis Preparatory School. He continued his studies at Cathedral College in Douglaston, Queens. After two years of studies he was sent to Rome where he attended the Pontifical Gregorian University and resided at the Pontifical North American College.

On July 15, 1962, Breen was ordained a priest in the Basilica of the Twelve Apostles, Rome. A year later, he graduated from the North American College, Gregorian University, Rome, with a licentiate in sacred theology.

Breen worked as a parish priest in the Diocese of Brooklyn for a short period of time and then was quickly appointed to be assistant superintendent of education for the Diocese of Brooklyn. He became an honorary prelate (monsignor) in 1977 and in 1978 he was appointed as the Superintendent of Education for the Diocese of Brooklyn. He was subsequently elevated to the position of Vicar for Education of the diocese.

In July 1997, Pope John Paul II appointed Breen to be the Bishop of Metuchen and he was consecrated a bishop by the then Archbishop of Newark, Theodore McCarrick.

Breen died of pneumonia in 2003, aged 66, following a long illness consistent with Alzheimer's disease.

References

1936 births
2003 deaths
People from Brooklyn
Roman Catholic bishops in New Jersey
St. Francis Preparatory School alumni
Religious leaders from New York (state)
Catholics from New York (state)
20th-century Roman Catholic bishops in the United States